Cumberland is the northeasternmost town in Providence County, Rhode Island, United States, first settled in 1635 and incorporated in 1746.  The population was 36,405 at the 2020 census, making it the seventh-largest municipality and the largest town in the state.

History 

Cumberland was originally settled as part of Wrentham, Massachusetts, which was purchased from the local Indigenous Americans by the Plymouth Colony.  It was later transferred to Rhode Island as part of a long-running boundary dispute. The town was named in honor of Prince William, Duke of Cumberland.

William Blackstone (also spelled William Blaxton in colonial times) was the first European to settle and live in Cumberland. (He was also the first European to have settled in Boston, but left when he and the newly arrived Puritans disagreed about religion.) He preached his brand of tolerant Christianity under an oak tree that became an inspiration to Christians worldwide. He lived on a farm in the Lonsdale area of Cumberland, where he cultivated the first variety of American apples, the Yellow Sweeting. The site of his home is now occupied by the Ann & Hope mill.

The popular tourist destination "Nine Men's Misery" is a tomb found on the grounds of a former Trappist monastery (Abbey of Our Lady of the Valley), part of which was destroyed in a fire in 1950. The Trappists sold the monastery and grounds to the town and part of the building was converted into the Edward J. Hayden Library, aka Cumberland Public Library in 1976. This combined three smaller libraries into one.

Cumberland was the site of iron works that made cannons and cannonballs for the French and Indian War and the American Revolution.  Additionally, Cumberland (along with the neighboring towns of Central Falls, RI, Lincoln, RI, and Attleboro, Massachusetts) was the home of the Valley Falls Company, which is the original antecedent of Berkshire Hathaway, now one of the world's largest and most successful companies.

A machine shop in Cumberland made the first power looms for woolens in America. These were reportedly used at the Capron Mill in Uxbridge, around 1820, that burned in a fire in 2007.

Cumberland is home to the headquarters and original location of the Ann & Hope chain of discount stores which claims to be the first chain of discount department stores in America and was founded in 1955.

Cumberland is in the lower Blackstone Valley of Rhode Island and in the John H. Chafee, Blackstone River Valley National Heritage Corridor, New England's historic National Park area.

Aaron Fricke was denied a request to bring a same-sex date to a school prom at Cumberland High School 1979. In an early legal victory for LGBT rights, a federal court held that such a denial violated the student's free speech rights, in Fricke v. Lynch.

In the summers of 2011 and 2014, the Cumberland American Little League baseball team, led by coach David Belisle (both times), won the New England Regional Little League Baseball Championship and went on to play in the Little League World Series.

Geography

Cumberland is the easternmost town along the state's northern border with Massachusetts, making it the state's de facto northeasternmost town.  Cumberland borders the Rhode Island cities of Woonsocket to the northwest and Central Falls, to the south and the town of Lincoln to the west as well as the Massachusetts towns of Wrentham to the north, Plainville and North Attleborough to the east and city of Attleboro to the southeast.

The Rhode Island state rock Cumberlandite is a rare iron-rich mineral unique to the region. The only large deposit of the mineral in the world is found off Elder Ballou Meeting House Road in northern Cumberland.  Though the ore was used to make cannons during the colonial era, the resulting casts were of poor quality and prone to cracking. A major geologic feature of the area is Diamond Hill, a massive outcropping of white quartz. The hill once was host to two small ski areas and is now a town park.

Demographics

As of the census of 2010, there were 33,506 people, 13,143 households, and 9,232 families residing in the town. The racial makeup of the town was 92.8% White, 1.5% African American, 0.3% Indigenous American, 2.3% Asian, 0.03% Pacific Islander, 1.4% from some other race, and 1.7% from two or more races. Hispanic or Latino of any race were 4.5% of the population.

There were 13,143 households, out of which 23.8% had children under the age of 18 living with them, 56.8% were headed by married couples living together, 9.8% had a female householder with no husband present, and 29.8% were non-families. 24.7% of all households were made up of individuals, and 11.6% were someone living alone who was 65 years of age or older.  The average household size was 2.53 and the average family size was 3.04.

In the town, the population was spread out, with 22.5% under the age of 18, 6.5% from 18 to 24, 24.9% from 25 to 44, 30.2% from 45 to 64, and 15.8% who were 65 years of age or older.  The median age was 42.5 years. For every 100 females, there were 93.6 males.  For every 100 females age 18 and over, there were 90.0 males.

At the 2000 census, the median income for a household in the town was $72,242, and the median income for a family was $84,038. Males had a median income of $41,073 versus $29,188 for females. The per capita income for the town was $32,378.  About 2.9% of families and 3.9% of the population were below the poverty line, including 3.1% of those under age 18 and 7.7% of those age 65 or over.

Government

In the Rhode Island Senate, Cumberland is split in its representation between the 19th District, represented by Democrat Ryan W. Pearson, and the 20th District, represented by Democrat Roger A. Picard. At the federal level, Cumberland is a part of Rhode Island's 1st congressional district, currently represented by Democrat David N. Cicilline.

In presidential elections, Cumberland is reliably Democratic as no Republican presidential nominee has carried the town in over three decades.

Schools

The school system is led by its seven-member School Committee that is elected to serve for two years and includes a Chairperson, Vice-chairperson and Clerk.  The School Committee hires a Superintendent of Schools to administer policies and to manage and lead learning in the district. The Cumberland Superintendent of Schools (in chronological order) are Mr. Robert Condon, Dr. Robert McGinnis, Mr. Rodney McFarlin, Dr. Robert Patterson, Mr. Robert Wallace (1993–1996), Mr. Joseph Nasif (1996–2005), Dr. Donna Morelle (2005–2011), Dr. Phil Thornton (2011–2015), and Mr. Robert Mitchell (2015–present).

Cumberland is home to a public charter school, the first Rhode Island Mayoral Academy, Blackstone Valley Prep (originally Democracy Prep Blackstone Valley).  The school opened in the fall of 2009 with Kindergarten.

The Blackstone Valley Prep High School, a $10 million mayoral charter school, opened in 2017 on the site of a former lumber center in Valley Falls.

The one non-public school in Cumberland, Mercymount Country Day School, is run by the Sisters of Mercy of the Americas, a Roman Catholic order which has its New England regional headquarters in Cumberland.

Culture and traditions

Cumberland is home to the Arnold Mills Fourth of July Parade and 4 Mile Road Race, which is held each year to celebrate (Fourth of July). The first recorded Arnold Mills Parade was held on July 4, 1927. During the 2020 COVID-19 pandemic, the road race was held "virtually" for the first time.

Cumberland Farms, a large convenience store chain, takes its name from the original dairy farm business in Cumberland, Rhode Island.

A popular event, Cumberlandfest, is held each year on the second weekend of August at Diamond Hill Park on Diamond Hill Road. This event features a carnival, with rides and venues, as well as live entertainment and a small fireworks show. Proceeds go to the town's athletic programs.

The Blackstone River Theatre at 549 Broad Street hosts a wide variety of cultural events mostly in the form of intimate concerts encompassing the prevailing traditional cultures of the people who settled the Blackstone Valley. The Blackstone River Theatre sponsors the annual Summer Solstice Festival at Diamond Hill State Park in Cumberland.

Historic Metcalf-Franklin Farm on Abbott Run Valley Road was the last working dairy farm in Cumberland. Open historic fields, exposed farmers walls and a traditional "cow" pond are open for exploration. The 1810s barn and 1850s house are in the process of historical preservation.

Notable people

 John Capron, Sr. (1797–1878), military officer, state legislator, and textile manufacturer; born in Cumberland
 Aaron Fricke, gay rights activist and author; successfully sued Cumberland High School for not allowing him to bring his same-sex partner to prom 
 Public Universal Friend (1752–1819), genderless evangelist; non-binary icon; born in Cumberland
 Johnny Goryl, Major League Baseball infielder 1957–1964; born in Cumberland
 Richard Jenkins, actor (Six Feet Under, Cheaper by the Dozen); nominated in 2008 for Academy Award for Best Actor (The Visitor); lives in Cumberland
 Brian Lawton, left wing for six different National Hockey League teams; grew up in Cumberland
 David Macaulay, British-born author and illustrator; graduated from Cumberland High School
 Dan McKee, 76th Governor of Rhode Island (2021–) and former Lieutenant Governor (2015–2021); the town's former mayor from 2007 to 2015; member of the town council for multiple terms 
 Cory Pesaturo, musician; three-time world champion, only person to ever win in acoustic, digital and jazz accordion; from Cumberland
 Stephen Peterson, rower on 1996 U.S. Olympic team and gold medalist at 1990 World Rowing Championships
 Pete Wells, restaurant critic for The New York Times
 Tim White, referee for World Wrestling Entertainment (WWE); born in Cumberland
 Inez Whipple Wilder (1871–1929), zoologist who studied fingerprints and salamanders; born in Cumberland

National Registered Historic Places

Arnold Mills Historic District
Ashton Historic District
Ballou-Weatherhead House
Berkeley Mill Village
Burlingame-Noon House
John Cole Farm
Furnace Carolina Site
Luke Jillson House
St. Joseph's Church Complex
Lewis Tower House
Tower-Flagg Barn Complex
Whipple-Jenckes House
Metcalf-Franklin Farm

References

External links

Town of Cumberland official website
Cumberland Public Library
Cumberland School Department
Arnold Mills July 4th Parade and Road Race
 Who is William Blackstone?, short biography of a local pioneer
 Detailed history of Cumberland, from History of the State of Rhode Island, by Albert J. Wright, 1878
 Historic Metcalf-Franklin Farm website

 
Towns in Providence County, Rhode Island
Providence metropolitan area
History of the textile industry
Portuguese-American culture in Rhode Island
Towns in Rhode Island